DARU Journal of Pharmaceutical Sciences is an open access peer-reviewed medical journal that was established in 1990. It covers all aspects of the pharmaceutical sciences. The editor-in-chief is Mohammad Abdollahi. The journal is published by BioMed Central on behalf of Tehran University of Medical Sciences.

Abstracting and indexing 
DARU is indexed and abstracted in:

According to the Journal Citation Reports, the journal has a 2017 impact factor of 2.667, ranking it 118 out of 261 journals in the category "Pharmacology & Pharmacy".

See also
Health care in Iran

References

External links 
 

Pharmacology journals
English-language journals
Publications established in 1990
Quarterly journals
Open access journals